Good Ventures is a private foundation and philanthropic organization in San Francisco, and the fifth largest foundation in Silicon Valley. It was co-founded by Cari Tuna, a former Wall Street Journal reporter, and her husband Dustin Moskovitz, one of the co-founders of Facebook. Good Ventures adheres to principles of Effective Altruism and aims to spend most or all of its money before Moskovitz and Tuna die. Good Ventures does not have any full-time staff, and instead distributes grants according to recommendations from Open Philanthropy.

History 
Cari Tuna, then a reporter at the San Francisco bureau of the Wall Street Journal, and Dustin Moskovitz, Facebook co-founder, started dating in 2009. In 2010, Moskovitz signed the Giving Pledge, and he and Tuna began investigating how best to give away the money.

Tuna first learned about charity evaluator GiveWell and the movement for effective giving after reading The Life You Can Save, and the couple was introduced to the ideas of effective altruism. Tuna and Moskovitz formed Good Ventures. Moskovitz was busy running Asana, so Tuna quit her job in 2011 to work full-time on Good Ventures. She also joined the board of GiveWell in April 2011.

In March 2013, Good Ventures launched its own website. In August 2014, GiveWell Labs, an internal project of GiveWell that did research on effective philanthropy, morphed into the Open Philanthropy Project, a joint venture of GiveWell and Good Ventures. Good Ventures no longer has any full-time staff, and distributes grants according to recommendations from Open Philanthropy.

Operations 
Good Ventures plans to spend out the majority of its money before the death of Moskovitz and Tuna. Most of the money for the foundation comes from the stock Moskovitz obtained as a Facebook and Asana co-founder. The organization has a publicly available grants database on its website. Good Ventures LLC invests in for-profits related to human health and well-being, and donates earnings to the Good Ventures Foundation. Its investments include Vicarious, a company working in artificial intelligence.

See also
 Chan Zuckerberg Initiative
 Giving What We Can
 Jasmine Social Investments
 Laura and John Arnold Foundation
 Mulago Foundation
 Omidyar Network
 Peery Foundation
 Skoll Foundation

References

External links
 

Foundations based in the United States
2011 establishments in California
Organizations based in San Francisco
Organizations associated with effective altruism